The Derryveagh Mountains are the major mountain range in County Donegal, Ireland. It makes up much of the landmass of the county and is the area of Ireland with the lowest population density. The mountains separate the coastal parts of the county, such as Gweedore and Glenties, from the major inland towns such as Ballybofey and Letterkenny. Its highest peak is Errigal.

See also
List of mountains in Ireland

References

Mountains and hills of County Donegal
Gaeltacht places in County Donegal
Mountain ranges of Ireland